Clas Myrddin, or Merlin's Enclosure, is an early name for Great Britain given in the Third Series of Welsh Triads. It is implied that it is the oldest name, as opposed to "Albion", but the implication is not wholly credible.

References

History of the British Isles
Terminology of the British Isles